Samyang Comtech is a South Korean manufacturer of bulletproof ballistic armors founded in 1962. It was designated as a defense contractor by the South Korean government in 1973 and supplies bulletproof helmets and bulletproof vests for infantry to the South Korean military, and also manufactures armor packages and add-on armor kits for armored vehicles such as the K1A1, K2 Black Panther and K21. Most of the products manufactured by Samyang Comtech are made from Dyneema-based materials, except for military vehicle armors.

History 
Samyang Comtech was founded on 22 December 1962 under the name Oriental Co., Ltd and In 1973, the company was designated as a defense contractor by the government.

In 1990, the R&D Laboratory was established for the development of new products, and in May 1997, the first domestic bulletproof helmet and bulletproof vest were developed for the South Korean military.

In June 1998, it began producing Korean Special Armor Plate (KSAP), the first domestic composite armor for main battle tanks developed for the K1A1.

In 2002 and 2003, it succeeded in developing the world's lightest bulletproof helmet weighing 1,115 grams.

In September 2006, the company name was changed from Oriental to Samyang Comtech (Samyang Composite Technology).

In June 2008, it was developed the special armor plate for the K2 Black Panther.

In December 2008, it was designated as a co-developer of a project responsible for transferring KSAP-based armor package technology to develop Turkish Altay MBT.

In 2011, it was developed armor kit for the light tactical vehicle (LTV) and an add-on armor for the wheeled armored vehicle (WAV).

In 2018, it was developed add-on armor for the 30 mm wheeled anti-aircraft guns, command post wheeled armored vehicle, and K239 Chunmoo export versions.

In 2019, it was developed steel ball filing for new 81 mm mortar.

Product

Ballistic Protection 
Armor for main battle tank (MBT)
Armor for infantry fighting vehicle (IFV)
Add-on armor for KAAV
Ceramic armor for K21
Bulletproof panel for light tactical vehicle (LTV)
Add-On armor kit for K239 Chunmoo MLRS (export version)
Add-On armor for new type 6X6 K806 Wheeled Armoured Vehicle (WAV)
Add-On armor for 30 mm wheeled anti-aircraft gun vehicle
Add-on armor kit for KAAK
Armored case for Commander's Panoramic Sight (CPS)
Protection panel for naval vessel
Fragments body armor for army
Aramid (Kevlar, Twaron) helmet
Anti-stab vest
Ultra-high molecular weight polyethylene (UHMW PE) helmet
Bulletproof body armor for riot police
Bulletproof body armor for special force
Bulletproof body armor for army
Nylon helmet
Hybrid armor plate 1
Hybrid armor plate 2
UHMW PE (Dyneema, Spectra) armor plate
Concealable body armor for civilian and VIP
Floating body armor for navy
Bulletproof body armor for police

Aircraft Parts 
Soundproof panel assembly
Protection panel assembly
Gunner seat and troop seat
Protection panel for FCS
Exhaust stack for helicopter
Fuel tank for fixed-wing aircraft
Fuel tank for helicopter

Composite Components 
Protection cover for POD radome
IFF system
Pole and spreader for MCNS
Fuel tank for MBT
Protection cover for K-SAM Pegasus
Steel ball filing
Protection cover for EOTS
Detonator part
Fuse part for K414 fragmentation grenade
Fuse assembly for KM201A smoke grenade
Antenna reflector panel

Ceramic Plates 
Oxide ceramics (AL2O3, AL2O3-SiO2)
Non oxide ceramics (SiC)

References

External links 

Defence companies of South Korea
Companies based in Seoul
Manufacturing companies of South Korea
Manufacturing companies established in 1962
South Korean brands
South Korean companies established in 1962